Landú Mavanga (born January 4, 1990) is an Angolan footballer who plays as a goalkeeper for AS Vita Club.

In 2019-20, he signed in for FC Bravos do Maquis in the Angolan league, the Girabola.

In 2020-21, he signed in for AS Vita Club in the Angolan league, the Girabola.

References

External links 
 

1990 births
Living people
Association football goalkeepers
Angolan footballers
Angola international footballers
2013 Africa Cup of Nations players
2019 Africa Cup of Nations players
Académica Petróleo Kwanda Soyo players
C.R.D. Libolo players
F.C. Bravos do Maquis players
Girabola players
Footballers from Luanda
2016 African Nations Championship players
Angola A' international footballers
Angolan expatriate sportspeople in the Democratic Republic of the Congo
Angolan expatriate footballers
Expatriate footballers in the Democratic Republic of the Congo
AS Vita Club players
2018 African Nations Championship players